Bittium laevicordatum is a species of minute sea snail, a marine gastropod mollusc in the family Cerithiidae, the cerithiids. It is known to occur only at the Three Kings Islands of New Zealand.

References

 Powell A. W. B., New Zealand Mollusca, William Collins Publishers Ltd, Auckland, New Zealand 1979 

Cerithiidae
Gastropods of New Zealand
Gastropods described in 1937